Kim Bum-soo or Kim Beom-soo is a Korean name consisting of the family name Kim and the given name Bum-soo, and may also refer to:

 Kim Bum-soo (born 1979) is a South Korean singer.
 Kim Beom-soo (businessman), chairman of Daum Kakao, a South Korean internet company
 Kim Bum-soo (footballer born 1968), goalkeeper coach
 Kim Bum-soo (footballer born 1972), who played at Jeonbuk Hyundai Motors and Anyang LG Cheetahs as FW
 Kim Bum-soo (footballer born 1986), who played at Sengnam Ilhwa Chunma and Gwangju Sangmu FC as MF